The Ma'anshan Yangtze River Bridge is a bridge complex over the Yangtze River in Ma'anshan, Anhui Province in eastern China.  The bridge complex carries a six-lane highway over two branch streams of the Yangtze and the island of Xiaohuangzhou in the middle of the river.

The bridge over the left stream is a suspension bridge with three towers and two  spans. This section is tied with the Taizhou Yangtze River Bridge as the longest double span suspension bridge in the world. The bridge over the right stream is a cable-stayed bridge with three towers and two .

The bridge project was approved in July 2004. The bridge opened on December 31, 2013.

See also
 List of bridges in China
 Yangtze River bridges and tunnels
 List of longest suspension bridge spans
 List of tallest bridges in the world

References

Bridges in Anhui
Bridges over the Yangtze River
Suspension bridges in China
Bridges completed in 2013